is a Japanese football player for Nankatsu SC.

Club statistics
Updated to 23 February 2018.

References

External links

Profile at Nankatsu SC

1989 births
Living people
Kanagawa University alumni
Association football people from Kagawa Prefecture
Japanese footballers
J2 League players
Shonan Bellmare players
Ehime FC players
Vonds Ichihara players
Nankatsu SC players
Association football defenders